The posterior and anterior radicular arteries run along the posterior and anterior roots of the spinal nerves and supply them with blood.

Relationship to segmental medullary arteries 
Radicular arteries can sometimes be replaced functionally by segmental medullary arteries. However, unlike those arteries, radicular arteries do not form anastamoses with the anterior or posterior spinal arteries. Radicular arteries are also generally smaller.

The Artery of Adamkiewicz is sometimes called "great radicular artery of Adamkiewicz", however it is in fact a segmental medullary artery.

References 

Arteries